Philippe-Marie Salvan (born ) is a former French male volleyball player. He was part of the France men's national volleyball team at the 1988 Summer Olympics and 1992 Summer Olympics. He also played at the 1990 FIVB Volleyball Men's World Championship in Brazil.

References

1965 births
Living people
French men's volleyball players
Place of birth missing (living people)
Olympic volleyball players of France
Volleyball players at the 1988 Summer Olympics
Volleyball players at the 1992 Summer Olympics